The 2009–10 Georgia Tech Yellow Jackets women's basketball team will represent Georgia Tech in the 2009–10 NCAA Division I basketball season. The Jackets are coached by MaChelle Joseph. The Jackets are a member of the Atlantic Coast Conference and will attempt to win the NCAA Championship.

Offseason
April 9: Georgia Tech broke ground Thursday on a  basketball practice facility which will be called the Zelnak Center. The facility was spurred by a lead gift from Steve and Judy Zelnak, the facility will be built at a cost of $5 million and be open in time for the beginning of pre-season practice in October. Zelnak is chairman, president and chief executive officer of Martin Marietta Materials in Raleigh, N.C.
April 28: In less than one week, the Georgia Tech women's basketball team will embark on an 11-day foreign tour to Tunisia and Paris. The Yellow Jackets will depart Saturday, May 2, and arrive in Tunisia the following day. The Jackets will spend the first six days of their trip in Port EL Kantaoui, Tunisia where they are scheduled to play an exhibition game against the Tunisian U-20 National Team and two games against the Tunisian National Team.
May 4: The Yellow Jackets opened a 46-18 halftime lead on the U-20 Tunisian National Team. Deja Foster scored a team-high 10 points in the first 20 minutes. The final score was Georgia Tech 77-35. The Jackets finished with 25 steals. Some of the top Tech performances include:
Brigitte Ardossi: 16 points, 8 rebounds, 5 steals
Deja Foster: 12 points, 7 rebounds, 7 assists, five steals
Iasia Hemingway: 11 points, 3 rebounds, 3 steals
Sasha Goodlett: 9 points, 4 rebounds
LaQuananisha Adams: 7 points, 6 rebounds
May 6: The Georgia Tech women's basketball team will take on Penn State in the third annual Big Ten/ACC Challenge. The Yellow Jackets and Nittany Lions will meet for the first time on Wednesday, December 2, 2009. The Jackets are 2-0 in the previous challenges with wins at Iowa and against Michigan State.
May 6: In the second game against the Tunisian National Team, Tech would win the game 58-35. Mo Bennett led the team with eight points, 12 rebounds and seven steals. Iasia Hemingway scored 14 points and Deja Foster added 10 points and nine rebounds.
May 7: Georgia Tech played the Tunisian National Team for a final time. At the end of the first quarter the game was tied at 12 and Tech would hold a 29-20 lead at the half. The second half was very competitive as Tunisia pulled within six points. A late 16-4 run by the Jackets sealed the 63-45 win and a perfect 3-0 record in Tunisia. Mo Bennett and Sasha Goodlett each scored 16 points and Brigitte Ardossi had seven points and nine rebounds in the game.

Preseason WNIT

Regular season
The Yellow Jackets competed in the Long Island University Thanksgiving Tournament from November 27–28.

Roster

Schedule

Player stats

Postseason

NCAA basketball tournament

Awards and honors

Team players drafted into the WNBA

See also
2009–10 ACC women’s basketball season
List of Atlantic Coast Conference women's basketball regular season champions
List of Atlantic Coast Conference women's basketball tournament champions

References

External links
Official Site

Georgia Tech Yellow Jackets women's basketball seasons
Georgia Tech
Georgia Tech